Operation: Mindcrime II is the ninth studio album by the American progressive metal band Queensrÿche, released internationally on March 31, 2006, and in the United States on April 4, 2006. It was the band's first album to be produced by Jason Slater.

It is a concept album and the sequel to the group's third studio album, Operation: Mindcrime (1988). The album resumes the story of Mindcrime, which is that of Nikki, a drug-addicted political revolutionary who had worked as an assassin before his disillusionment and arrest. Nikki had been jailed for the murder of prostitute-turned-nun Sister Mary at the end of Mindcrime, with his sanity slipping as he genuinely didn't know who had killed Mary and had grown close to her before her death. As Mindcrime II begins, eighteen years later, Nikki is released from prison and begins to plot his revenge against Dr. X, a manipulative demagogue from the first album that had treated Nikki as his puppet.

Vocalist Pamela Moore reprises her role as Sister Mary for the album. The role of Dr. X (played by actor Anthony Valentine on the first album) went to famous heavy metal singer Ronnie James Dio. Singer Geoff Tate handles the vocals for the protagonist.

Following the split between Geoff Tate and the rest of Queensrÿche in 2012, it was revealed in a sworn declaration by producer Jason Slater that the album received very limited contributions from the band members aside from Tate and Mike Stone. Much of the music was recorded by studio musicians due to conflicts between Tate and his bandmates. Drummer Scott Rockenfield did not play on the album at all. As well, most of the guitars, including Michael Wilton's tracks, were re-recorded by engineer Mitch Doran. Some of the bass tracks used are demo recordings played by Slater, while the drum track to "I'm American" is a MIDI recording made by Doran that was not originally intended for use on the final album. Slater and Doran's bandmates from Snake River Conspiracy, Ashif Hakik and Matt Lucich also contributed with recordings for this album. 

The album debuted at number 14 on the Billboard 200 album chart, selling 43,773 copies in its first week, and became the highest chart position for a Queensrÿche album since Promised Land peaked at No. 3 in 1994. The tracks "I'm American" and "The Hands" have been released as singles, with accompanying music videos being created.

Story
The story picks up eighteen years after the events of Operation: Mindcrime, starting on the day that Nikki is released from prison. During his incarceration, Nikki has been unable to let go of his hatred for Dr. X, a manipulator who has remained rich and powerful within the massively corrupt society around him. Nikki still harbors resentment against the American government in particular, which he still views as autocratic and greedy, being simply beyond saving. The training to kill and powerful brainwashing that Nikki had received from Dr. X still has a strong hold over him, with his sanity still much in doubt, but Nikki feels conflicted nonetheless. While he still greatly desires revenge upon Dr. X and wants to see a revolutionary change in his decrepit society, his thoughts drift to Mary.

Nikki lands himself in trouble with the law once again. During his trial, his pleas for mercy and leniency are lost on a judge and jury still remembering his past crimes. This only deepens his disdain for the world around him, with Nikki mulling over the government, the legal system, and Dr. X as he blames all three for all of his problems. After Nikki escapes and finds himself yet again on the run, his own need for revenge coupled by a vision of Mary's ghost (it is initially unclear if this spectre actually exists or is merely a product of Nikki's mind breaking with reality) turns his thoughts toward killing Dr. X.

As a final confrontation gets closer, Nikki starts to have more doubts. He questions himself and wonders if he should own up to the fact that it's also his fault that his life is as bad as it is. Nikki does track down Dr. X, beginning a dramatic chase, and Nikki finally kills him when the seminal moment comes. Yet the murder seems to fail to bring Nikki the solace that he so wants. Wondering whether the killing has really made anything better, Nikki is further consumed by doubt and despair. The ghost of Mary appears again and confronts Nikki. He starts to think that he has crossed the line into pure insanity, with the world holding no escape for his sadness, and he commits suicide. As the album ends, Nikki's spirit is reunited with Mary's, with it being revealed that they achieve some kind of happy end in the afterlife, and they reflect that the only times they were happy before were in the fleeting moments that they were together.

The story of Operation: Mindcrime II was also expanded on with video and actors during Queensrÿche's live performances of the album.

Background and reception

The songs refer back to the previous Mindcrime album frequently, including in the song titles. The track "I'm American", which was released as a single, alludes to "Revolution Calling" from Mindcrime as the vocalist describes an alternative United States which, in the fictionalized world of the albums, is immersed in greed and uncaring corruption to the point of being somewhat of a dystopia, where a regular person on the street can't know whom to trust. The psychology of Nikki is summed up in lines such as: "Tried hard to scratch the surface of life, got bloody broken fingernails now".

As stated before, the album's production took place during a moment of deep tension and frustration between the band's members. The rest of the band felt reluctant to add to the original story of Mindcrime and disagreed with the idea of a sequel. With producer Jason Slater at the helm, the work received only a small amount of contributions from the band members aside from Tate and Mike Stone, with Wilton calling the production process "haphazard". A great deal of material was recorded by studio musicians rather than by the group. The album was recorded from February 28 to December 3, 2005.  The lead single, titled "I'm American," was performed by Queensrÿche during their 2005 tour, which they took in support of the group Judas Priest.

Some critics such as AllMusic reviewer Thom Jurek praised the album, with Jurek particularly citing the guitar work as well as the grim and gritty tone of the lyrics. Jurek additionally labeled the release as "a fitting sequel" and remarked that the band "are absolutely on fire here". Generally positive reviews also came from publications such as About.com, where critic Chad Bowar remarked that the songs "flow perfectly into each other and the story-line is interesting."

Mixed to negative reviews have appeared in the Encyclopaedia Metallum.

The album received some significant commercial success, debuting on the Billboard 200 album chart at #14.

Track listing

All songs written by Jason Slater, Mike Stone and Geoff Tate except where noted.

Personnel
Band members
Geoff Tate - lead vocals
Michael Wilton - lead guitar
Mike Stone - rhythm guitar, backing vocals
Eddie Jackson - bass, backing vocals

Additional personnel 
Matt Lucich - drums 
Jason Slater - bass, additional percussion, backing vocals
Mitch Doran - guitars, additional percussion, backing vocals, MIDI programming on "I'm American"
Ashif Hakik - orchestration, keyboards, guitars
Miranda Tate - backing vocals on "The Hands"

Cast
Ronnie James Dio - Dr. X
Pamela Moore - Sister Mary

Technical personnel
Jason Slater - production, recording, mixing
Mitch Doran - engineering
Chris Wolfe - mixing
John Greenham - mastering

Charts

References

2006 albums
Concept albums
Queensrÿche albums
Rock operas
Sequel albums
Rhino Records albums
Albums produced by Jason Slater